Beggar's Oil is an EP by American blues singer and guitarist Kelly Joe Phelps, released in 2002.

History
Beggar's Oil was recorded at Long View Farms from Feb 6 - Feb 13, 2001, during the same sessions that produced Sky Like a Broken Clock. Phelps' first releases were essentially his voice and the voice of his slide guitar. He assembled a band and put aside the slide guitar to focus on his fingerpicking style.

"Lass of Loch Royale (If I Prove False to Thee)" was recorded live at the Kuumbwa Jazz Center in Santa Cruz, CA on November 20, 1999. The title track is the same as found on Sky Like a Broken Clock.

Reception

Music critic Chris Jones of the BBC Folk/Country Reviews wrote "Simply, this record brings us true tales from the barren outposts of the human heart. A genuine original."

Track listing
All songs written by Kelly Joe Phelps except "Lass of Loch Royale (If I Prove False to Thee)" (Traditional).
"Beggar's Oil"
"Tommy"
"Don Quixote's Windmill"
"Frankenstein Party of Three: Your Table is Ready"
"Beggar's Oil" (band arrangement)
"Lass of Loch Royale (If I Prove False to Thee)"

Personnel
Kelly Joe Phelps - vocals, guitar, resonator guitar, slide guitar
Larry Taylor - bass
Billy Conway - drums, percussion
Tom West - Hammond organ
Dinty Child - pump organ, accordion
David Henry - cello
Jim Fitting - harmonica

Production
Produced by George Howard
Engineered by David Henry
Mixed by George Howard and David Henry
Mastered by Jeff Lipton
Track 6 recorded by Dave Nielsen and mixed by Julie Rix

References

External links
Discography at Kelly Joe Phelps official web site.

2002 EPs
Kelly Joe Phelps albums
Rykodisc EPs
Albums recorded at Long View Farm